Zygmunt Grodner (12 January 1932 – 21 February 2020) was a Polish fencer and physician. He competed in the team épée event at the 1952 Summer Olympics.

References

External links
 

1932 births
2020 deaths
Polish male fencers
Olympic fencers of Poland
Fencers at the 1952 Summer Olympics
Fencers from Warsaw
20th-century Polish physicians
21st-century Polish people
20th-century Polish people